Jonas Olsson (born 14 January 1970) is a Swedish football manager and former player.

Playing career 
He played 266 official games for IFK Göteborg during his career as a player, won six Swedish Championships, and played in the UEFA Champions League. He also represented the Sweden U17, U19, and U21 teams.

Coaching career
He managed IFK Göteborg together with Stefan Rehn from 2007 to 2011. On 4 October 2011, he agreed to take over as coach of Sogndal from the 2012-season.

References

External links

1970 births
Living people
Swedish footballers
Allsvenskan players
IFK Göteborg players
Swedish football managers
IFK Göteborg managers
Sogndal Fotball managers
Ullensaker/Kisa IL managers
Allsvenskan managers
Eliteserien managers
Swedish expatriate football managers
Expatriate football managers in Norway
Swedish expatriate sportspeople in Norway
Association football defenders
Footballers from Gothenburg